Gustav Klinger (1876 – 1937? or 1943) was a Russian Bolshevik politician. Klinger joined the Party in 1917 in time for the revolution and was leader of the Volga German Soviet government 1918. He became business manager for the newly founded Communist International in 1919, and was elected to the Comintern Executive Committee in 1920. Klinger held various governmental posts in the Soviet Union during the 1920s. He was eventually killed during the Stalinist purges, probably in 1937.

Notes

1876 births
1930s deaths
Year of birth uncertain
Old Bolsheviks
Communist Party of the Soviet Union members
Executive Committee of the Communist International
Great Purge victims from Russia
Volga German people